Reus is the capital of Baix Camp, in the province of Tarragona, in Catalonia, Spain. The area has always been an important producer of wines and spirits, and gained continental importance at the time of the Phylloxera plague. Nowadays it is known for its commercial activity, for being a centre for rock-climbing and as the birthplace of architect Antoni Gaudí.

Name

The origin of the name is a source of discussion. One of the theories is that Reus comes from the Latin word used to describe convict prisoners (reus), and as such, it would be a Roman penitentiary. Currently, the most accepted theory is that the name has Celtic roots, from the root red that originated the name redis (or reddis), that would approximately mean place in the way / place in the roads, or said alternatively, an inhabited place in a cross-road.

History

Foundation and early history 

Around 1150 Robert d'Aguiló repopulated the region of Reus, after receiving it on 3 June 1154. On 5 June 1154 the archbishop of Tarragona gave two-thirds of Reus to Bertran de Castellet, as a castellan, with the order to build a church. On 29 June 1159, the distribution of income from ecclesiastical goods, the third of its Reus parish of Santa Maria was awarded to the camerlengo, starting the duplicity of governing the town. The camerlengo has the third of Reus parish. At this time the city was known as Redis or Reddis. The castellan Bernat de Bell-lloc gave the title of town to Reus on 3 August 1183, giving the ownership of houses and gardens, establishing a census to pay for farmland and reserving justice, but recognizing its vassalage towards the archbishopric of Tarragona. On 2 June 1186 the camerlengo Joan de Santboi confirmed the rights given by the castellan Bernard de Bell-lloc.

Camerlengo, Popes and Archbishops of Tarragona
In 1305 Reus revolted against the Archbishop Rodrigo Tello, who wanted that the citizens of Reus pay for rebuilding the walls of Tarragona. In 1309 the king of Aragon gave to Reus the right to do market on Mondays. The dynasty of Bell-lloc castellans became extinct in 1327 and then Bernard de Cabrera became the new castellan, but in 1335 the castellan was sold to Pere Mulet, who lost it on 1345. Pere Mulet heirs sold their rights to Bernat d'Olzinelles in 1349. The camerlengo Pere Roger de Belfort disputed domain to the Archbishop López de Ayerbe, which sent an army that decimated the town. A second attack was repulsed. A third attack led military occupation of the town and Reus was sacked. The camerlengo Pere Roger de Belfort, nephew of Pope Clement VI, who was living in Avignon with his uncle, he persuaded the Pope to call the archbishop of Tarragona and the Pope received a commitment for peace.
Pere Roger de Belfort gave the roses of his coat to coat of arms of the town and later he became Pope Gregory XI, keeping it as a camerlengo of Reus, so the coat of arms was crowned with adorned with papal tiara and keys of St. Peter.

Catalan Revolt war and the Archduke Charles
At the beginning of the Catalan Revolt war the town had 1200 houses, but reduced to 800 by the end of the war. On 16 December 1640 was declared an enemy of the fatherland by the Parliament and confiscated the goods of the inhabitants, as a response to the inactive participation in the war. In 1641 it was occupied by the French general La Mothe.

Reus was loyal to Philip V until 1705, but this year, under the direction of Joan Nebot, revolted in favor of the Archduke Charles. On 3 July 1706 the Archduke Charles came to the town. In 1707 fell shortly to the Bourbons, but in 1709 Reus surrendered to the Spanish and French Bourbons. In 1710 Reus returned again to the field of Archduke Charles. On 5 June 1712 the wife of the Archduke, Elisabeth Christine, gave the title of imperial city to Reus. In 1713 Reus was occupied finally by the Bourbon.

Growth in the eighteenth century
In the eighteenth century Reus had phenomenal growth and became the second city of the principality of Catalonia. The walls were completely demolished in 1766. The town developed the textile trade and the liquor trade. In this last contribution was the first center, the others were London and Paris. From this time it's the popular sentence "Reus, Paris and London”, because Reus was one of the centers of the liquor marquet. The construction of a canal between Reus and Salou, proposed by Pere Sunyer was granted in 1805, but it was stopped because of the French War. At this time Reus had consulates in the United States, Liguria, England, Holland, Sweden, Ragusa, Denmark, Sicily, the Papal States, France, Portugal, Naples and Prussia.

19th and 20th centuries 

In 1854 the Reus Gas Company was founded. In 1856 the railway between Reus and Tarragona was built. In 1884 the Catalan Association of Reus was founded and in 1893 was celebrated the Assembly of the Unió Catalana. In 1886 Pau Font de Rubinat founded the Catalan newspaper Lo Somatent. In 1895 the phylloxera killed big areas of vineyards in the region of Reus and many of this areas were changed to hazelnuts.

In 1931 Reus voted for the republic. In 1936 Francisco Franco bombed the city until his rebel army occupied the city on 15 January 1939, starting with the dictatorship of Franco until his death in 1975.

The first democratic mayor after Franco was Carles Martí Massagué, lawyer of Reus. In 1983 Anton Borrell Marcó was the new mayor of the city, but he died in a car accident on the road from Reus to Cambrils, then his successor was Juan Maria Roig. After him, Josep Abelló Padró was the mayor until 1999, replaced by Lluís Miquel Pérez Segura, who occupied the position until 2011, when the current mayor, Carles Pellicer i Punyed, started.

Demography
Reus was for long the second city of Catalonia with a population of 14,440 in 1787 and 27,257 in 1860. It was overtaken by Tarragona and Lleida between 1900 and 1930. The population barely grew between 1920 and 1930, with 30,266 and 35,950 inhabitants, respectively. From then, the population growth has been substantial, from 41,014 inhabitants in 1960 to 108,100 inhabitants that the city has as of the end of 2008. Immigration, mostly from Marrakesh, has been a portion of that increase. About 6% are Muslim and 8% from other religions.

According to the 2006 official Spanish census (source: Instituto Nacional de Estadística), Reus is the 9th most populous city in Catalonia and the 59th in Spain.

Climate
Reus has a Hot-summer Mediterranean climate, the Köppen Climate Classification subtype for this climate is Csa.

Economy

During the 19th and 20th centuries Reus became known as one of the world's major centers of liquor production, and was home to over 30 producers of vermouth. Today Reus is home to major exporters of vermouth including Yzaguirre, Iris (Muller), Miró, and Fot-Li.

Festivities

The principal Reus festivity is Sant Pere on June 29, declared of National Touristic Interest. One of the most characteristic and popular acts of these festivities is the so-called tronada, which is a series of 29 little mortars masclets with bangers interleaved, arranged linearly around the Mercadal square (where the city hall is located), united by a hand craft gunpowder line. This line ends in a square shape in front of the city hall, with more bangers and 9 more masclets. Also, on September 25, the Mare de Déu de la Misericòrdia is held.

Other noteworthy festivities are the Carnival and the Anada a l'Antiga towards Salou. Most of the neighborhoods have their own festivities.

Besides the major festivities, Reus holds many festivals, for example Cos, a festival dedicated to mime, or El Trapezi, a festival with circus spectacles. In every odd numbered year the Reus Institut Municipal d’Accio Cultural presents the Biennals Internacionals de Fotografia Medalla Gaudi. This bi-annual exhibition features fine art photographers from around the world working in Alternative Photographic Processes (such as Platinum Printing, Gum Dichromate, Etc.). At each Biennal they award the Medalla Gaudi award to a select few artists and purchase their work for the Institut Municipal d’Accio Cultural's permanent collection.

Main sights

Catalan Modernist edifices
The city of Reus has many Catalan modernist buildings. Although Antoni Gaudí was born in Reus, there are no buildings designed by him; there are, however, numerous modernist buildings from his colleagues as Lluís Domènech i Montaner, Pere Caselles i Tarrats and Pere Domènech Roura.
 Casa Navàs, Lluís Domènech i Montaner (1901–1908)
 Casa Rull, Lluís Domènech i Montaner (1901)
 Casa Gasull, Lluís Domènech i Montaner (1910–1912)
 Institut Pere Mata, Lluís Domènech i Montaner (1899–1919)
 Casa Pinyol, Pere Caselles i Tarrats (1910)
 Escoles Prat de la Riba, Pere Caselles i Tarrats (1911)
 Escorxador, Pere Caselles i Tarrats (1899)
 Estació Enològica, Pere Caselles i Tarrats (1906–1910)
 Casa Munné, Pere Caselles i Tarrats (1904)
 Casa Sardà, Pere Caselles i Tarrats (1896)
 Casa Marco, Pere Domènech Roura (1926)
  Xalet Serra, Joan Rubió i Bellver (1911)

Other sights
 Castell del Cambrer
 Campanar de Reus
 Town Hall
 Palau Bofarull
 Centre de Lectura
 Museu Salvador Vila-seca
 Teatre Fortuny
 Gaudí Centre

Sport
The city has a roller hockey team Reus Deportiu, one of the most important in Spain, and dispute the main league OK Liga.

The association football team was CF Reus Deportiu.

The Barcelona Dragons of the European League of Football plan to play their home games at the local Estadi Municipal.

Tourism

In recent years, tourism in Reus has expanded as more and more people come to the Costa Daurada region for their summer holidays or some winter sun. Nowadays, the largest group of tourists comes from Russia, followed by France and Holland.

Reus is close to the resort town of Salou and one of Europe's biggest theme resort at PortAventura World. Tour companies and buses operate services to Reus from tourist destinations in the region such as Salou, La Pineda and Cambrils.

The accommodation in Reus consists of small hotels, hostels, and major chained hotels owned by NH Hoteles and Hotusa Group.

Recently Reus Airport has started to receive low cost flights from Ryanair that fly to Reus from many different European locations and North Africa. The airport also receives major charter flights from the United Kingdom. Barcelona Airport is another airport which serves the area for those destinations not served by Reus Airport.

Transport
The city is served by Reus Airport.

Flag of Reus
The first flag of Reus was in use from 1774 to 1943. The flag was dark red with the city arms in the centre.

In 1943 the flag was changed because the color red seemed to be associated with the left, defeated in the civil war (1936–39). As the historic city arms were argent with a heraldic rose the new flag was white with a heraldic rose in the center. Minor changes to the rose in the flag were made after 1943.

Currently the rose has a new version, taken from the city emblem. The emblem itself has official status. This presumably also applies to the flag, but this has not been confirmed by the local government.

Notable people
 Ramon Bosc (1300s–1416), Catalan priest and writer in Latin
 José Brocá (1805–1882), guitarist and composer
 Joan Prim i Prats (1814–1870), military general and politician
 Michael Domenec (1816–1878), bishop
 Vicente Folch (1754–1829), military officer and Governor of West Florida (1796 - 1811).
 Baldomer Galofre (1849–1902), painter
 Roseta Mauri i Segura (1849–1923), ballerina and dance teacher
 Antoni Gaudí (1852-1926), architect
 Ceferí Olivé (1907–1995), painter
 François Tosquelles (1912–1994), psychiatrist
 Alejandro Cao de Benós (born 1974), President of the Korean Friendship Association
 Isaac Cuenca (born 1991), football player
 Sergi Roberto (born 1992), football player
 Andreu Buenafuente (born 1965), late night show host

Twin cities
Reus is twinned with:

  Bahía Blanca, Argentina, since 1994
  Hadžići, Bosnia and Herzegovina, since 1995
  Astorga, Spain, since 1998
  Amgala, Sahrawi Arab Democratic Republic, since 2000
  Boyeros, Cuba, since 2000
  Gandia, Spain, since 2008

References
 This article incorporates information from the revision as of 19 August 2010 of the equivalent article on the Catalan Wikipedia.
 Panareda Clopés, Josep Maria; Rios Calvet, Jaume; Rabella Vives, Josep Maria (1989). Guia de Catalunya, Barcelona: Caixa de Catalunya.  (Spanish).  (Catalan).

External links

 Official website
 Official Reus Tourist Website
 Government data pages 

 
Municipalities in Baix Camp
Populated places in Baix Camp